Glenea funerula is a species of beetle in the family Cerambycidae. It was described by James Thomson in 1857. It is known from Sumatra, India, Malaysia, and Java.

Subspecies
 Glenea funerula funerula (J. Thomson, 1857)
 Glenea funerula javana (Pic, 1946)

References

funerula
Beetles described in 1857